Myrna Lou Culbreath (born September 1, 1938) is an American science fiction writer and editor, most well known for the Star Trek tie-in novels and anthologies cowritten with Sondra Marshak. Culbreath was a founding editor of the libertarian editorial magazine The Fire Bringer.

Her analysis of the Star Trek character Spock, originally published in an issue of The Fire Bringer, was lauded by Gene Roddenberry as the "best analysis ever done" of the character.

Early life 
According to a local newspaper in Colorado Springs, Culbreath operated a tutoring school in Colorado Springs, Colorado, in the early 1960s. The school offered preparation for GED and CLEP tests, as well as reading classes for students with disabilities and disabled veterans. The school had branch offices in Denver and Cortez.

Culbreath is an objectivist and a libertarian, and she was a member of the Young Americans for Freedom. She attended the first Libertarian Party convention in June 1972. Frustrated by the political platform that emerged during the convention, Culbreath "filibustered" until all anti-war messaging was withdrawn from the platform. She later resigned from the party.

Sometime before 1977, Culbreath moved to Baton Rouge, Louisiana. She shared a home with her writing partner, Sondra Marshak. She currently resides in Torrance, California near Marshak.

Fannish activity 
During the publication run of The Fire Bringer, Culbreath corresponded with Gene Roddenberry. A number of their letters were collected in the fifth issue of The Fire Bringer under the "Star Trek Reprint." Her analysis, "Reviews of Art and Achievement: Star Trek: The Man Who Invented a Universe: The Universe He Invented: Star Trek and the Spock Premise," was included. Roddenberry praised the article during his appearance at Vul-Con I (1973), saying it was "required reading for all Star Trek fans." The article's fanac shorthand title is the "Spock Premise."

Career 

Culbreath made a number of attempts at writing a Star Trek episode spec script, with Roddenberry's encouragement. Her preferred title for the script was "Triangle." Once renewal of the television series proved unlikely, Roddenberry introduced Culbreath to fan writer Jacqueline Lichtenberg, who then introduced Culbreath to Sondra Marshak. The three corresponded for several months. Culbreath and Marshak formally met at a Star Trek convention in Baton Rouge sometime later.

Marshak and Culbreath went on to co-author four original Star Trek novels, including Triangle (1983), which was based upon and inspired by Culbreath's unfinished script. They also edited two short story anthologies, The New Voyages and its sequel, which collected two of their stories. Culbreath also contributed trivia to The Star Trek Puzzle Manual (1976). She co-wrote the William Shatner biography Shatner: Where No Man… (1979) with Marshak and Shatner.

Star Trek: The New Voyages (1976) was Culbreath's first professionally published work. However, she was loosely involved with the production of Star Trek Lives! (1975), along with Marshak, Lichtenberg, and television producer Joan Winston.

In the author's notes for The Fate of the Phoenix (1979), Culbreath and Marshak announced a fictional travel guide to the planet Vulcan, tentatively titles Mr. Spock's Guide to the Planet Vulcan, and a non-Star Trek science fiction novel with William Shatner, The Power, were forthcoming. Other planned releases included new installments of The New Voyages series. None of the announced titles were realized or released.

The Phonics Game, published by A Better Way Learning, and PhonicsOpoly, sometimes called PhonOpoly, published by LearnByGames, were created by Culbreath. Marshak also contributed content, and participated in sales and promotion to school teachers.

On an episode of the "Future Talk" podcast hosted by Zoh Hieronimus, Culbreath was introduced as a well-known television and radio host, but no hosting details were given. Culbreath explained she had frequently "substituted for a nationally syndicated radio host," but she did not mention for whom. Other than an interview published in Voyages of Imagination (2006), and her appearances on "Future Talk" (2004), Culbreath has not given any new interviews. She has not produced any new fiction under her name since the release of Triangle.

Bibliography

Non-fiction 
 The Star Trek Puzzle Manual (November 1976), with Jeff Razzi and Sondra Marshak. Bantam Books .
 Shatner: Where No Man…: The Authorized Biography of William Shatner (December 1979), with William Shatner and Sondra Marshak. Ace .

Editor 
 Star Trek: The New Voyages (March 1976), with Sondra Marshak. Bantam Books #X2719.
 Star Trek: The New Voyages 2 (January 1978), with Sondra Marshak. Bantam Books .

Fiction 
 The Price of the Phoenix (July 1977), with Sondra Marshak. Bantam Books .
 The Fate of the Phoenix (May 1979), with Sondra Marshak. Bantam Books .
 The Prometheus Design (March 1982), with Sondra Marshak. Pocket Books .
 Triangle (March 1983), with Sondra Marshak. Pocket Books .

Short fiction 
 "Surprise!" Star Trek: The New Voyages 2 (January 1978) with Nichelle Nichols and Sondra Marshak.
 "The Procrustean Petard," Star Trek: The New Voyages 2 (January 1978) with Sondra Marshak.

Games 
 The Phonics Game (October 1996). A Better Way Games.
 PhonicsOpoly: The Phonics Game (January 1999). LearnByGames.

References

External links 
 .
 Authors: Culbreath, Myrna at The Encyclopedia of Science Fiction
 Myrna Culbreath at Goodreads.

1938 births
Living people
Objectivists
American science fiction writers
Women science fiction and fantasy writers
Star Trek fiction writers
Star Trek fanfiction writers
American libertarians